Nick Kyrgios defeated Alexander Zverev in the final, 6–3, 6–4 to win the men's singles tennis title at the 2019 Mexican Open. Kyrgios saved three match points en route to the title, in his second-round match against Rafael Nadal.

Juan Martín del Potro was the reigning champion, but withdrew due to injury before the tournament began.

Seeds

Draw

Finals

Top half

Bottom half

Qualifying

Seeds

Qualifiers

Lucky loser

Qualifying draw

First qualifier

Second qualifier

Third qualifier

Fourth qualifier

References

External Links
Main draw
Qualifying draw

Abierto Mexicano Telcel - Singles
Men's Singles